Odd Squad (Italian: Ciao nemico, also known as The Odd Squad and The Bridge Between) is a 1981 Italian war comedy film directed by Enzo Barboni.

Plot 
After the Allied landing in Sicily, between the U.S. Army and the Italian Army there is an ancient Roman bridge that both want to blow up; but both Italian and American sappers do their best to not do it. Together, they think an absurd plan to make the invading American division that the Italians surrendered and the War is ended. After they part ways, forty years later the American Lieutenant (now an older college engineer teacher) watches the bridge and prepares to go to theater, because his old same-rank enemy became a conductor and that evening he's gonna direct Verdi's Nabucco.

During the end credits, there are info about the ten soldiers; everyone went back to their previous favorite talents and made a career on it.

Cast 
 Johnny Dorelli - Lt. Federico Tocci
 Giuliano Gemma - Lt. Joe Kirby
 Jackie Basehart - Pvt. Kirk Jones
 Salvatore Borgese	- Soldier Salvatore Ficuzza
 Vincenzo Crocitti	- Soldier Tazio Meniconi
 Massimo Lopez - Soldier Pasquale Cutolo
 Riccardo Pizzuti - Soldier Dario Tognon
 Vincent Gardenia - General Brigg
 Eros Pagni - Italian Colonel
 Riccardo Garrone	- Lt. Rondi
 Ivan Rassimov - Pvt. Russ Baxter
 Carmen Russo - The Girl
 Jacques Herlin - French General

Reception 
The film received mixed reviews. Morando Morandini praised the film as "pleasant and full of comical inventions".  Flaminio Di Biagi described it as a "quite ramshackle little comedy".

See also       
 List of Italian films of 1981

References

External links

 

1981 films
1980s war comedy films
Italian war comedy films
Military humor in film
Macaroni Combat films
Films set in Sicily
Films scored by Franco Micalizzi
1981 comedy films
Italian World War II films
Italian Campaign of World War II films
1980s Italian films